USP6 N-terminal-like protein is a protein that in humans is encoded by the USP6NL gene.

References

Further reading